Racing TV (formerly Racing UK) is a British television channel with 34 racecourses as shareholders and fixtures from 61 racecourses broadcast live on its output. As Racing UK grew several other business units and joint ventures were developed under the ownership of the parent company Racecourse Media Group Ltd. Racing TV is one of the two major UK horse racing television channels, the other being Sky Sports Racing. The station is dedicated to horse racing broadcasting over 70% of all live racing from Britain and Ireland, including nearly 90% of all Group and Graded races.

On 17 December 2018, Racing UK was rebranded as Racing TV on air in anticipation of the first live broadcast of racing from Ireland on 1 January 2019. At the same time, Racing TV began promoting its new Racing TV Extra service which provides viewers with dedicated feeds from each racecourse fixture via Streaming and OTT TV platforms(SD only for Virgin Media Ireland customers).

Racecourse Media Group
Racecourse Media Group Ltd (RMG) is the umbrella organisation for the 34 Racecourses, which holds their interest in Racing TV, Racecourse Retail Business, Racing TVi and RDC. The racecourses (and shareholders) are: Aintree, Ayr, Beverley, Carlisle, Cartmel, Catterick Bridge, Cheltenham, Chelmsford, Epsom Downs, Exeter, Fakenham, Goodwood, Hamilton Park, Haydock Park, Huntingdon, Kelso, Kempton Park, Leicester, Ludlow, Market Rasen, Musselburgh, Newbury, Newmarket, Nottingham, Perth, Pontefract, Redcar, Salisbury, Sandown Park, Stratford, Taunton, Thirsk, Warwick, Wetherby, Wincanton and York.

Contracted courses
The list of the racecourses that are contracted to Racing TV are:

Aintree
Ascot (British Champions Day only)
Ayr
Ballinrobe
Bellewstown
Beverley
Carlisle
Cartmel
Catterick Bridge
Chelmsford City
Cheltenham
Clonmel
Cork
Curragh
Downpatrick
Down Royal
Dundalk
Epsom Downs
Exeter
Fairyhouse
Fakenham
Galway
Goodwood
Gowran Park
Hamilton Park
Haydock Park
Huntingdon
Kelso
Kempton Park
Kilbeggan
Killarney
Laytown
Leicester
Leopardstown
Limerick
Listowel
Ludlow
Market Rasen
Musselburgh
Naas
Navan
Newbury (contract expire on 31 December 2023)
Newmarket
Newmarket (Rowley)
Nottingham
Pontefract
Perth
Punchestown
Redcar
Roscommon
Salisbury
Sandown Park
Sligo
Stratford-on-Avon
Taunton
Thirsk
Thurles
Tipperary
Tramore
Warwick
Wetherby
Wexford
Wincanton
York

Name
Attheraces [1] was launched on 1 May 2002 but had run into financial difficulties by the spring of 2004. After its demise two new channels were created at very short notice to continue broadcasting the sport of horse racing in the UK. AtTheRaces [2] re-launched on 11 June 2004, which later became Sky Sports Racing. The other channel's name was originally the "Horse Racing Channel" but this became “Racing UK” upon its launch on 29 May 2004 - when Rishi Persad presented its first live programme from Kempton - featuring racing from Kempton, Doncaster, Musselburgh and Cartmel. It remained Racing UK until its rebrand to Racing TV ahead of the launch of live racing from Ireland on 1 January 2019.

Programming 
The channel starts broadcasting before live racing every day. In the mornings Racing Replay and/or Irish Racing Replay is shown until one of Mark Your Card, Full SP or Luck on Sunday are broadcast, live racing from the UK and Ireland typically follows in the afternoon and evening. The programmes have been produced in High-definition at Ealing Studios since 2012 and on location from the 61 racecourses. Racing UK was the first dedicated horse racing channel to broadcast racing in HD when it launched its new service on 14 March 2016.

 Live Racing
 Racing Replay
 Irish Racing Replay
 Mark Your Card
 This Racing Life
 Luck On Sunday
 The Road to Cheltenham
 The Friday Club
 The Full SP
 My Racing Life

Presenters 

 Angus McNae – Studio presenter and on-course reporter
 Nick Lightfoot – Studio presenter and on-course reporter
 Nick Luck – Studio presenter and on-course reporter. Also worked for Channel 4 Racing
 Lydia Hislop – Studio presenter and on-course reporter. Also worked for BBC Sport
 Rishi Persad – Studio presenter and on-course reporter. Also works for BBC Sport and ITV Racing
 Ruby Walsh – Occasional studio work and on-course reporter. (former jockey). Also works for ITV Racing
 Tom Stanley – Studio presenter and on-course reporter.
 Gary O'Brien - On-course reporter.
 Kevin O'Ryan - On-course reporter.
 Fran Berry – On-course reporter (former jockey).
 Niall Hannity – Studio presenter and on-course reporter (former jockey).
 Rachel Casey – Studio presenter and on-course reporter.
 Gordon Brown – On-course reporter.
 Martin Dwyer – Occasional studio work and on-course reporter (jockey). 
 George Baker (jockey) - Occasional studio work and on-course reporter (former jockey).
 Sam Turner - On-course reporter and tipster.
 Dave Nevison - On-course reporter and tipster.
 Chris Dixon - On-course reporter.
 Martin Dixon - On-course reporter.
 Mark Howard - On-course reporter.

References

External links

Racecourse Media Group
Racing TV on Twitter

Sports television channels in the United Kingdom
Sports television in the United Kingdom
Horse racing mass media in the United Kingdom
Horse racing mass media
Television channels and stations established in 2004